The Al-Ghufran Royal Mausoleum is a Royal Mausoleum of Perak located near Ubudiah Mosque at Bukit Chandan in Jalan Istana, Kuala Kangsar, Malaysia. The first Sultan of Perak buried here was Sultan Idris Murshidul Azzam Shah I in 1916.

Architecture
The Al-Ghufran Royal Mausoleum was built in 1915. The mausoleum architecture is a Moghul style and similar to the Taj Mahal in India.

List of royal graves

Sultan
 Sultan Idris Murshidul Azzam Shah I Ibni Almarhum Raja Bendahara Alang Iskandar Teja (Marhum Rahmatullah) (died: 14 January 1916)
 Sultan Abdul Jalil Karamatullah Nasiruddin Mukhataram Shah Ibni Almarhum Sultan Idris Murshidul Adzam Shah I Rahmatullah (Marhum Radziallah) (died: 26 October 1918)
 Sultan Abdullah Muhammad Shah II Ibni Almarhum Sultan Jaafar Safiuddin Muadzam Shah Waliullah (Marhum Habibullah) (died: 22 December 1922)
 Sultan Iskandar Shah Ibni Almarhum Sultan Idris Murshidul Azzam Shah I Rahmatullah (Marhum Kaddasullah) (died: 14 August 1938)
 Sultan Abdul Aziz Al-Mutasim Billah Shah Ibni Almarhum Raja Muda Musa (Marhum Nikmatullah) (died: 26 March 1948)
 Sultan Yussuf Izzuddin Shah Ibni Almarhum Sultan Abdul Jalil Karamatullah Nasiruddin Mukhataram Shah Radziallah (Marhum Ghafarullahu-lah) (died: 4 January 1963)
 Sultan Idris Iskandar Al-Mutawakkil Alallahi Shah II Ibni Almarhum Sultan Iskandar Shah Kaddasullah (Marhum Afifullah) (died: 31 January 1984)
 Sultan Azlan Muhibbuddin Shah Ibni Almarhum Sultan Yussuf Izzuddin Shah Ghafarullahu-lah (Marhum Al-Maghfullah) - 9th Yang di-Pertuan Agong (1989-1994) (died: 28 May 2014)

Raja Perempuan/Pemaisuri (Queen)
 Raja Tipah Binti Almarhum Sultan Shahabuddin Riayat Shah Saifullah (died: unknown date)
 Raja Nuteh Aishah Binti Almarhum Sultan Yusuf Sharifuddin Muzaffar Shah Ghafirullah (died: 6 October 1920)
 Raja Nuteh Zahra Binti Almarhum Sultan Ali Al-Mukammal Inayat Shah Nabiallah (died: unknown date)
 Raja Puteh Umi Kalsom Binti Raja Kulop Muhammad Kramat (died: 9 May 1972)
 Raja Khalijah Binti Almarhum Sultan Idris Murshidul Azzam Shah I Rahmatullah (died: 1 October 1939)
 Raja Taayah Binti Raja Abdul Hamid (died: 18 February 1962)
 Raja Muzwin Binti Raja Ariff Shah (died: 6 October 2011)

Royal Families

 Raja Musa I Ibni Almarhum Sultan Jaafar Safiuddin Muadzam Shah Waliullah - (Raja Muda of Perak) (died: 1906)
 Raja Chulan Ibni Almarhum Sultan Abdullah Muhammad Shah II Habibullah - (Raja Di-Hilir of Perak) (died: 10 April 1933)
 Raja Muhammad Mansur Ibni Almarhum Sultan Abdullah Muhammad Shah II Habibullah (died: 27 August 1934)
 Raja Zainal Azman Shah Ibni Almarhum Raja Chulan - (Raja Kecil Bongsu of Perak) (died: 16 December 1956) Raja Abdul Rashid Ibni Almarhum Sultan Idris Murshidul Azzam Shah I Rahmatullah - (Raja Bendahara of Perak) (died: 24 November 1958) Raja Kamarulzaman Ibni Almarhum Raja Muhammad Mansur - (Raja Di-Hilir of Perak) (died: 19 July 1962) Raja Abdul Malek Ibni Almarhum Sultan Abdullah Muhammad Shah II Habibullah
 Raja Ekram Ibni Almarhum Sultan Yussuf Izzuddin Shah Ghafarullahu-lah - (Raja Di-Hilir of Perak) (died: 9 June 1978) Raja Musa II Ibni Almarhum Sultan Abdul Aziz Al-Mutasim Billah Shah Nikmatullah - (Raja Muda of Perak) (died: 12 May 1983) Raja Ahmad Saifuddin Ibni Almarhum Sultan Iskandar Shah Kaddasullah - (Raja Muda of Perak) (died: 12 April 1987) Raja Ahmad Hisham Ibni Raja Abdul Malek - (Raja Di-Hilir of Perak) (died: 21 September 1997) Raja Ashman Shah Ibni Almarhum Sultan Azlan Muhibbuddin Shah Al-Maghfullah - (Raja Kecil Sulong of Perak) (died: 30 March 2012) Raja Shahruzzaman Ibni Almarhum Sultan Idris Iskandar Al-Mutawakkil Alallahi Shah II Afifullah (died: 10 October 2014) Raja Izuddin Chulan ibni Almarhum Raja Zainal Azman Shah - (Raja Kecil Bongsu of Perak) (died: 28 March 2022)Non Royal Families
 Tun Mohd Suffian Hashim - Lord President of Supreme Court of Malaysia (died: 2000) Mohammad Amin Bin Alang Duakap @ Abdul Wakaf - Orang Kaya-Kaya Laksamana Raja Mahkota of Perak (Died and buried in Singapore (1908). Relocated from Singapore (2006)) Tan Sri Dato' Osman Bin Talib - Orang Kaya Bendahara Seri Maharaja of Perak. Former Chief Minister of Melaka. (died: 1984) Dato' Seri Wan Abdul Halim Bin Wan Abdul Jalil - Orang Kaya Temenggong Paduka Raja of Perak (died: 1998) Dato' Seri Wan Omar Bin Wan Hamaruddin - Orang Kaya Temenggong Paduka Raja of Perak (died: 1992) Dato' Seri Wan Omar Bin Wan Ahmad Rasdi - Orang Kaya Menteri Paduka Tuan of Perak (died: 2003) Dato' Seri Wan Ahmad Isa Shukri Bin Wan Ahmad Rasdi - Orang Kaya Menteri Paduka Tuan of Perak (died: 1992) Osman Bin Uda Maamor - Orang Kaya-Kaya Shahbandar Paduka Indera of Perak (died: unknown date) Dato' Seri Ibrahim Bin Abdul Karim - Orang Kaya-Kaya Shahbandar Paduka Indera of Perak (died: 1982) Dato' Wan Mohd Ali Bin Wan Omar - Orang Kaya-Kaya Seri Adika Raja Shahbandar Muda of Perak (died: 1954) Datuk Setia Bijaya DiRaja Jeragan Abdul Shukor - Orang Kaya-Kaya Setia Bijaya Diraja of Perak (died: 1924) Syed Abdul Hamid bin Syed Safi Jamalullail - Orang Kaya Besar Maharaja di Raja of Perak (Orang Besar 4), Orang Besar Jajahan Kerian (died 1949).
 Datuk Setia Mohd Noordin Bin Jeragan Abdul Shukor - Orang Kaya-Kaya Setia Bijaya Diraja of Perak (died: unknown date) Dato' Seri Abdul Wahab Bin Mohd Noordin - Orang Kaya-Kaya Setia Bijaya Diraja of Perak (died: 1989) Mohd Tahir Bin Jeragan Abdul Shukur - Penghulu Jajahan Daerah Gerik (died: 1946) Mohd Hamidi Bin Mohd Tahir - (died: 1994) Col (Rtd) Dato' Seri Mohamed Zulkifli Bin Mohamed Kushairi - Orang Kaya-Kaya Shahbandar Paduka Indera of Perak (1983-2009), Orang Besar Jajahan Kerian, Perak.(1993-2009) (died: 2009) Datuk Wan Mohammad Khair-il Anuar Wan Ahmad - Kuala Kangsar Member of Parliament (died: 2016)''

Mausoleums in Malaysia
Buildings and structures in Perak
Kuala Kangsar District